Cicimli (until 2008, Cimcimli; also, Dzhidzhimli, and Dzhimdzhimly) is a village and municipality in the Barda Rayon of Azerbaijan.  It has a population of 277.

References 

Populated places in Barda District